Dee Ice Piedmont is an ice piedmont between Pavie Ridge and the mouth of Clarke Glacier on the east side of Mikkelsen Bay, west coast of the Antarctic Peninsula. It was surveyed from the ground by the British Graham Land Expedition, 1936–37, and by the Falkland Islands Dependencies Survey, 1948–50. It was photographed by the Ronne Antarctic Research Expedition, November 1947 (trimetrogon air photography), and was named by the UK Antarctic Place-Names Committee after John Dee, an English mathematician and pioneer teacher of navigation methods for 30 years during a period of great maritime expansion and exploration (1527-1608,1609).

References

Ice piedmonts of Palmer Land